Lindh v. Murphy, 521 U.S. 320 (1997), was a United States Supreme Court case in which the Court held the Antiterrorism and Effective Death Penalty Act of 1996's amendments to Title 28, Section 2254 of the United States Code applies to cases filed after the Act's effective date. The amendments "do not apply to pending noncapital cases such as Lindh's."

In his dissent, Chief Justice William Rehnquist argues that "in light of the whole of our retroactivity jurisprudence," pending cases should be subject to the Antiterrorism and Effective Death Penalty Act of 1996's amendments.

References

External links
 

United States Supreme Court cases
United States Supreme Court cases of the Rehnquist Court
1996 in United States case law